The White Stripes is the debut studio album by American rock duo The White Stripes, released on June 15, 1999. The album was produced by Jim Diamond and vocalist/guitarist Jack White, recorded in January 1999 at Ghetto Recorders and Third Man Studios in Detroit. White dedicated the album to deceased blues musician Son House.

Recording and production
Johnny Walker of the Soledad Brothers played slide guitar on two songs: "Suzy Lee" and "I Fought Piranhas". Walker is credited with having taught Jack White how to play slide, a technique featured heavily on the White Stripes' first two albums. Walker explains, "[Jack] had a four track in his living room and invited me to come by and do some recording. In return, I showed him how to play slide."

The duo covered "St. James Infirmary Blues" after, according to Jack, he and Meg were introduced to the song from a Betty Boop cartoon.

Critical reception

The album received mostly positive reviews.  Norene Cashen of The Metro Times said the LP "serves better to remind us that [Detroit's] local identity has more options than a membership card to the latest cliché...or a one-way ticket to the coast."

Much of the media feedback came two or three years after its initial release, following the duo's fame spreading beyond Detroit.  AllMusic said of the album, "Jack White's voice is a singular, evocative combination of punk, metal, blues, and backwoods while his guitar work is grand and banging with just enough lyrical touches of slide and subtle solo work... Meg White balances out the fretwork and the fretting with methodical, spare, and booming cymbal, bass drum, and snare... All D.I.Y. punk-country-blues-metal singer-songwriting duos should sound this good."

BBC DJ John Peel first spotted the album in a record shop and said, "I just liked the look of it and I looked at the titles – you develop an instinct, d'you know what I mean? And it looked like the sort of record I would like, so I took it out and I did like it, and started playing it." His endorsement was key in heightening their popularity in the UK.

Track listing

Personnel
The White Stripes
Jack White – lead vocals, guitar, piano, record producer
Meg White – drums

Additional personnel
Johnny Walker – second slide guitar on "Suzy Lee" and "I Fought Piranhas"
Jim Diamond – production, engineering
Ko Melina Zydeko – photography
Heather White – photography

Charts

Certifications and sales

Release history

References

External links

 Official album page

1999 debut albums
The White Stripes albums
Sympathy for the Record Industry albums
Albums produced by Jack White
Third Man Records albums